Mangaya (Buga) is a Ubangian language of South Sudan. The endonym is Bug.

As of 2013, they reside in Sopo Payam, Raja County. Ethnic Buja (Buga) live in Sopo Boma, while ethnic Banda live in Mangayat Boma of Sopo Payam.

References

Languages of South Sudan
Sere languages